Caldo de queso is a traditional queso (cheese) soup made in places in Hermosillo, Sonora (north Mexico).

The soup is made with boiled water, diced potatoes, onions, tomato, chile verde and oregano. Tomato puree or dehydrated chicken broth may also be added to the mix as condiments.

The cheese is added only at the end, once the other are ingredients are boiled, to prevent gratination. It is most usually prepared with dices of queso fresco or queso cotija; the contact with the boiling soup heats the cheese and gives it a gummy, chewable texture; in turn it melts slightly, giving the soup a characteristic flavor.

Caldo de queso is generally accompanied by chiltepin or totopos (fried corn tortilla chips).

See also
 List of cheese dishes
 List of soups

References

Cheese soups
Mexican soups
Mexican cheeses